The Apiacá are an indigenous people of Brazil.

Apiacá or Apiacás may also refer to:

Apiacá language, the language of the Apiacá people
Apiacá, Espírito Santo, a municipality in Espírito Santo, Brazil
Apiacá River, in Mato Grosso, Brazil
Apiacás, a municipality in Mato Grosso, Brazil
Apiacás Ecological Reserve, a state ecological reserve in Mato Grosso, Brazil